Ophthalmotilapia heterodonta is a species of cichlid endemic to Lake Tanganyika where it is only known from the northern end of the lake.  It can reach a length of  TL.  It can also be found in the aquarium trade.

References

heterodonta
Fish described in 1962
Taxa named by Hubert Matthes
Taxa named by Max Poll
Taxonomy articles created by Polbot